Probe Profiles (formerly known as Probe, The Probe Team and The Probe Team Documentaries) is a Philippine documentary television program broadcast by ABS-CBN, GMA Network and ABC. The program was hosted by Cheche Lazaro. It premiered on March 6, 1987 and ended on June 30, 2010.

The program, considered as the pioneer television news-magazine in the Philippines, started airing in 1987 on ABS-CBN, with Lazaro, Maria Ressa (founder/chief executive officer of online news site Rappler; formerly ABS-CBN News head and former CNN Jakarta bureau chief) and Luchi Cruz-Valdes (currently TV5 News and Information (News5) Head and former ABS-CBN Current Affairs head as well as former GMA Network executive) at the helm. After one year and fourteen months, it moved to GMA Network as a blocktimer. It was in GMA where The Probe Team had its longest run in its history.

Overview
After more than two decades of censorship and repression, press freedom was immediately restored with the dismantling of the Marcos dictatorship by a popular revolt in 1986 (People Power Revolution). Media ownership was turned over to an enthusiastic private sector eager to take advantage of the newfound democratic space.

Probe Productions Inc. was a product of the euphoric period. Convinced that Filipinos need more than just the news, four pioneering journalists – Cheche Lazaro, Maria Ressa, Luchi Cruz-Valdes, Tony Velasquez and Angie Ramos – adopted the investigative newsmagazine format and called the television program Probe. The project, which was first broadcast over ABS-CBN, turned out to be the country’s first, most awarded and longest-running, investigative news-magazine show.

To make investigative pieces a main fixture in Philippine television, the group put up its own production house and continued with what it started. Operating from a small bedroom, the show’s one-hour reports were broadcast as monthly specials by a new television station—GMA Network. After the third telecast, in response to enthusiastic reviews, GMA gave The Probe Team (Probe’s new name) a weekly slot. The first weekly telecast began on May 20, 1988.

The Probe Team, or Probe Profiles, is known for fearlessly exposing the hard truths in Philippine society. No non-sense and hard-hitting, Probe tackles pressing societal concerns through the eyes of various stakeholders and calls a spade a spade. It engenders a deeper understanding and appreciation of issues by way of stories that capture the hearts and minds of viewers.

PAGCOR Controversy
Due to a controversy surrounding one of its features which involved a Philippine government official close to former President Gloria Macapagal Arroyo in 2003, its contract with GMA was terminated for 15 years. As a result, it moved to ABC and renamed the show The Probe Team Documentaries.

The show returned to its original home, ABS-CBN, in 2005, and was retitled back to Probe. It has continued the tradition of airing provocative documentaries and investigative reports. On June 17, 2009, it was known as Probe Profiles.

Final hosts
Cheche Lazaro

Probe alumni
 Cecilia Lazaro  - Host, Founder and President of Probe
 Maria Ressa - former CNN Jakarta Bureau Chief; former Vice President for News and Current Affairs, ABS-CBN; News Chief, Rappler.com
 Luchi Cruz-Valdes - Vice President for News and Information, TV5
 Nessa Valdellon - Vice President for GMA News and Public Affairs
 David Celdran - News Director and Anchor, ANC; PCIJ
 Manny Ayala - National Geographic Channel Singapore
 Apa Ongpin - former ABS-CBN News Lifestyle Reporter & also former cast member in a sitcom, Palibhasa Lalake
 Ditsi Carolino - Documentarist
 Marga Ortigas - Former GMA 7 News Anchor & Currently as Manila Bureau Chief, AlJazeera
 Angie Ramos- Producer, Reuters Singapore
 Karen Davila - Anchor, Bandila and Host, Ako Ang Simula (ABS-CBN); Host, Headstart (ANC)
 Pauline Mangilog-Saltarin - Creative Director, Jesuit Communications Foundation; Contributing Producer, Caldecott Productions/NHK Japan
 Jessica Domingo Lara - Producer, Lakbay TV; freelance writer, OffTheGridNews.com (USA)
 Ruben Canlas - Professor and IT Management Consultant
 Carol Gancia - Executive Producer / CEO - Ripplemakers, Inc.; CEO - Sikat Naturals; Filmmaker/Writer - Ripplemakerstv.com; Producer - Google, Inc.; Associate Producer - KQED TV San Francisco; Executive Producer - I-Witness (GMA 7)
 Angelina Cantada - Independent Filmmaker, Executive Producer, I-Witness (GMA 7)
 Tony Velasquez - Anchor, ANC and Headline Pilipinas (DZMM TeleRadyo)
 Twink Macaraig - Anchor, AksyonTV
 Howie Severino - Host, I-Witness (GMA 7); Editor-in-Chief, GMANews.tv; PCIJ; Anchor, News to Go (GMA News TV)
 Love Añover - Host, Unang Hirit and Lovely Day (GMA 7)
 Jay Cesora Orense - Former Executive Producer for various GMA Public Affairs shows, Author "Silence Speaks", Program Manager TV5 News and Information or News5
 Bernadette Sembrano - Former Anchor, TV Patrol Weekend and Current host, Salamat Dok and Umagang Kay Ganda (ABS-CBN)
 Pinky Webb - Anchor, ANC and TV Patrol Weekend and Host, XXX; CNN Philippines
 Eliza Zamora-Solis - Former Executive Producer, I-Witness and Case Unclosed (GMA 7); Senior Correspondent TV5 News and Information, Editorial Consultant, Insider (TV5)
 Ella Evangelista - Program Manager, GMA 7 Public Affairs
 Karen Lumbo - Program Manager, GMA 7 Public Affairs
 JM Cobarrubias - Program Manager, GMA 7 Public Affairs
 Michaela Cabrera - Fulbright Scholar at Columbia University; Producer and Reporter, Reuters Manila
 Rolly Ng - Cameraman, Reuters Manila
 Kathy Quiano - Reporter/ Producer (CNN Jakarta)
 Rene Santiago - Former cameraman CNN Jakarta: Chief cameraman (TV5)
 Garlic Garcia - Headwriter/Creative Consultant (ABS-CBN Entertainment)
 Abbie Lara - Director, I -Witness (GMA 7)
 Joseph Laban - Fulbright Scholar at NYU; Managing Producer (GMA 7); Contributing Producer, New York Times; PCIJ, Cinemalaya Director
 Bong Lozano - Director, Unang Hirit (GMA 7)
 Lloyd Navera - former Executive Producer and Director, I-Witness; Program Manager, GMA 7 Public Affairs
 Minette Tirona, Program Manager, GMA 7
 Inky Santiago - Nakpil, Contributing Manila Producer, CNN, Discovery Channel and BBC
 Lolita Lachica - Producer, English Current Affairs, Channel News Asia, Singapore
 Robert Alejandro - Graphic Artist & also a former TV host of Art Is Kool: now currently co-manager of Papemelroti Gift Store
 Kath Mendoza-Hernandez - Supervising Producer, Art-is-Kool / Producer, Probe
 Adrian Ayalin - Media Officer, US Embassy; Reporter Government News and Public Affairs Group-RPN; Anchor, NewsWatch (RPN): now currently as a senior reporter of ABS-CBN News.
 Alexis Loinaz- Managing Editor, Metromix New York
 Nike Lorenzo - Contributing Producer, Al Jazeera Manila
 Kara Magsanoc-Alikpala - Managing Director, Asianeye Productions; Contributing Producer, CNN
 Leogarda Sanchez-Matias - Assistant Vice President for Public Affairs, GMA 7
 Macky Recinto Fernando - Marketing Manager, Probe Productions, Inc. Special Projects Division
 Betong Sumaya - Sole Survivor Philippines: Celebrity Doubles Showdown, GMA 7; Segment Host, Unang Hirit and Ang Pinaka, GMA 7; Executive Producer, Day Off; Sunday PinaSaya; GMA News TV 27; now current hosts of All Out Sundays & Centerstage, GMA 7
 Akiko Thomson - Olympic swimmer; current Philippine Sports Commission commissioner
 Ricky Carandang - Malacanang Spokesman
 Ivy Cay (DJ Diwata of 91.5 Big Radio)

Accolades

PMPC Star Awards for Television: Best Public Affairs Program (2009)
Gawad CCP Para Sa Telebisyon (Winner,1988-1999)
Catholic Mass Media Awards (Hall Of Famer, 1987-1999)

References

External links
 
 

1987 Philippine television series debuts
2010 Philippine television series endings
ABS-CBN News and Current Affairs shows
English-language television shows
Filipino-language television shows
GMA Network original programming
GMA Integrated News and Public Affairs shows
Philippine documentary television series
TV5 (Philippine TV network) news shows